80 Air Navigation School is a unit of the South African Air Force. It is currently an aerial navigation, maritime operations and maritime survival school.

 Historic aircraft flown: Lockheed Ventura, various on loan
 Current aircraft flown: None (the school loans the C-47TP, Cessna Caravan and PC-7 Mk.II Astra from other units as required)

References

Squadrons of the South African Air Force
Military units and formations in Cape Town
Military units and formations established in 1946
Aviation schools